= Basavarsikoppa =

Coordinates: 15.3479°N 74.9954°E

- Village
- Interactive map of Basavarsikoppa
- Country: India
- State: Karnataka
- District: Dharwad

Government
  - Type: Panchayat raj
  - Body: Gram panchayat

Population (2011)
  - Total: 178

Languages
  - Official: Kannada
- Time zone: UTC+5:30 (IST)
- ISO 3166 code: IN-KA
- Vehicle registration: KA
- Website: karnataka.gov.in

Basavarsikoppa is a village in Dharwad district of Karnataka, India.

== Demographics ==
As of the 2011 Census of India there were 32 households in Basavarsikoppa and a total population of 178 consisting of 98 males and 80 females. There were 27 children ages 0-6.
